MV Troubridge was a ferry that served the South Australian coastal trade between Port Adelaide, Kingscote on Kangaroo Island and Port Lincoln. It was built by Evans Deakin & Company, of Brisbane, Queensland as a roll on roll off ferry to minimise loading time and maximise time spent at sea.

Operational history
Troubridge was built to replace SS Karatta in serving on the Adelaide - Kingscote - Port Lincoln route. It began services to Kingscote and Port Lincoln in 1961. Services to Port Lincoln were eventually discontinued leaving Troubridge to dedicated Kingscote Services.  It operated until 1 June 1987, when it was replaced by Island Seaway.

Troubridge was sold and went to Malta in 1990 as City of Famagusta. She was then bought by European Seaways and renamed European Glory. Her ownership passed to Poseidon Lines, under the name Sea Wave. In 1995 she was registered in Turkey as Karden. She was re-registered in North Korea in 2003 as Marwa, before being finally scrapped in Turkey in 2004.

References

Kangaroo Island
Ferries of South Australia
Ships of South Australia